Michael Christopher Landau (born June 1, 1958) is an American musician, audio engineer, and record producer. He is a session musician and guitarist who has played on many albums since the early 1980s with Boz Scaggs, Minoru Niihara, Joni Mitchell, Rod Stewart, Seal, Michael Jackson, James Taylor, Helen Watson, Luis Miguel,  Richard Marx, Steve Perry, Pink Floyd, Phil Collins on "Two Hearts" and "Loco in Acapulco", Roger Daltrey, Stevie Nicks, Glenn Frey, Eros Ramazzotti, Whitney Houston, and Miles Davis. Landau, along with fellow session guitarists Dean Parks, Steve Lukather, Michael Thompson and Dann Huff, played on many of the major label releases recorded in Los Angeles from the 1980s–1990s. He has released music with several record labels, including Ulftone Music and Tone Center Records, a member of Shrapnel Label Group.

In addition to his session work, Landau has led several bands, including Raging Honkies and Burning Water. In the early 1980s, he was also in the band Maxus with Robbie Buchanan, Mark Leonard, Jay Gruska, and Doane Perry.

Early life

Landau was born and raised in Los Angeles, California.

Career

At age 19, he was touring the globe with Boz Scaggs, and the following year, he began performing in studios on the recommendation of his friend Steve Lukather.

Influences
Landau cites influences including the Beatles, Jimi Hendrix, Led Zeppelin, Cream, the Band, Weather Report, Pat Martino, and Jaco Pastorius.

Equipment
Landau has a signature Single coil guitar pickup with Suhr Guitars called the 'ML.' In 2013, Fender announced that they would be collaborating with Landau on a signature Stratocaster. In 2015, Fender released the Michael Landau Signature amplifier, a modified version of Hot Rod DeVille III.

Throughout the 1980s and 1990s, Landau used a rack switching system made by Bob Bradshaw of Custom Audio Electronics. Other notable users of such systems were Steve Lukather and Eddie Van Halen.

Discography
Solo releases
 Tales from the Bulge (1990)
 The Star Spangled Banner (2001)
 Michael Landau Live 2000 (2001)
 The Michael Landau Group-Live (2006)
 Organic Instrumentals (2015)
 Rock Bottom (2018)
 Liquid Quartet Live (2020)

With Blue Horn
 Noise for Neighbors (2000)

With Renegade Creation
 Renegade Creation (2010)
 Bullet (2012)

With Hazey Jane
 Holy Ghost (2009)

With Stolen Fish
 Give Me A Ride (1999)
 Like I Said (2001)

With the Raging Honkies
 We Are The Best Band (1994)
 Boner (1996)

With Burning Water
 Burning Water (1991)
 Mood Elevator (1992)
 Live And Lit (1993)
 Abbandonato (1994)

With Rita Lee
 Bom Bom (1983)

With James Taylor

With Michael Bolton
 Soul Provider (1989)
 Time, Love & Tenderness (1991)
 Timeless: The Classics (1992)
 The One Thing (1993)
 All That Matters (1997)
 Only a Woman Like You (2002)

With Richard Marx

With Barry Manilow
 Barry (1980)
 Manilow (1985)

With Kenny Rogers
 Once Upon a Christmas, Kenny Rogers and Dolly Parton (1984)
 What About Me? (1984)
 The Heart of the Matter (1985)
 They Don't Make Them Like They Used To (1986)

With Tim McGraw

With Laura Branigan
 Branigan (1982)
 Branigan 2 (1983)
 Self Control (1984)
 Hold Me (1985)
 Touch (1987)

With Joni Mitchell
 Wild Things Run Fast (1982)
 Dog Eat Dog (1985)
 Chalk Mark in a Rain Storm (1988)
 Night Ride Home (1991)
 Turbulent Indigo (1994)
 Taming the Tiger (1998)

With Sheena Easton
 Best Kept Secret (1983)
 A Private Heaven (1984)
 My Cherie (1995)

With Faith Hill
 Breathe (1999)
 Cry (2002)
 The Rest of Our Life, Faith Hill and Tim McGraw (2017)

With Luis Miguel
 Aries (1993)
 Nada Es Igual (1996)
 Amarte Es Un Placer (1999)
 Mis Romances (2001)
 33 (2003)

With Mari Hamada

With Miho Nakayama
 Wagamama na Actress (1993)
 Mid Blue (1995)

With others

References

External links
 Official website
 
 
 
 Myspace page
 Official Tone Center website

1958 births
Living people
American session musicians
American male guitarists
Lead guitarists
Guitarists from Los Angeles
20th-century American guitarists
21st-century American guitarists
Yellowjackets members
Provogue Records artists